Rose Media and Entertainment, formerly known as Rose Video and Rose Animation is a Thai entertainment company. It was founded in 1986 by Phiraphon Montphichit. The company for markets, and distribute film, music, and anime licensor in 2000 to 2017, but later included the owner of BNK48's label Independent Artist Management.

History
The company was founded in 1986 by Phiraphon Montphichit. The company began as video rental business as Rose Video, The name Rose Video is derived from Rose, which is derived from Oraphan's nickname. Later the company changed its name to Rose Media and Entertainment. Rose Media start as anime licensor business in 2000 and flourished in the late 2000s. Notable series that were licensed by Rose Media and Entertainment include Doraemon, Naruto, Reborn!, Bleach, Sgt. Frog, Hunter x Hunter, and Attack on Titan. The final Rose Media's license was Attack On Titan and lost revenue caused several anime licenses to be cancelled in 2017. The company focuses more on idol music business and later established sub-company called BNK48 Office or Independent Artist Management.

In currently, Rose Media and Entertainment specializes in distribution music (usually Thai country music) and film.

Gangcartoon Channel
Rose Media and Entertainment launched the Gangcartoon TV Channel, which is a 24-hour anime airing channel on cable television in Thailand, and began airing on September 23, 2008, based on the Gangcartoon anime programming block, which was shown on the Thai Channel 5 on Saturdays and Sundays from 6:30 to 9:30 a.m. Gangcartoon Channel was closed in 2017.

Anime

2000
 Ultraman: The Ultimate Hero
 The Return of Ultraman
 Fireman
 Dr. Slump (1997)
 Sonic X

2001
 Doraemon
 Monster Rancher

2002
 Kyuukyuu Sentai GoGoFive
 Mirai Sentai Timeranger

2003
 Hyakujuu Sentai Gaoranger

2004
 Ninpuu Sentai Hurricaneger
 DAN DOH!

2005
 Bakuryū Sentai Abaranger

2006
 Naruto
 Garo
 Tokusou Sentai Dekaranger

2007
 Keroro
 Bleach
 Mermaid Melody Pichi Pichi Pitch
 Mahou Sentai Magiranger

References

External links
 rose.co.th
 www.gangcartoon.net

Companies based in Bangkok
Entertainment companies of Thailand
Entertainment companies established in 1986
Anime companies
Thai companies established in 1986